Fontecchio is a comune and town in the Province of L'Aquila in the Abruzzo region of Italy. The small, medieval village is located within the Monte Sirente community and the Sirente-Velino Regional Park.

History
There is archaeological evidence of the Roman settlement of Fonticulanum down on the Aterno river. In the Middle Ages a castle was built on top of the hill and the population moved up there. The condottiero Braccio da Montone ("Fortebraccio") (1368–1424) tried and failed to capture the castle in the 14th century.

Today you can see a wonderful and well conserved historical centre.
Many fragments of ancient monuments are displayed in the L'Aquila museum.

Transport 
Fontecchio has a stop on the Terni–Sulmona railway, with trains to L'Aquila and Sulmona.

Notes and references

Cities and towns in Abruzzo